Bruno Giuranna (born 6 April 1933 in Milan) is an Italian violist.

Giuranna was also responsible for a transcription of Bach's Goldberg Variations. The world premiere recording of this work was made by the Trio Broz in 2008.

In 2020, Giuranna serves as president of the central board for ESTA (European String Teachers Association).

Notes

External links
 

1933 births
Living people
Musicians from Milan
Italian classical violists
Italian music educators
Academics of the Royal Academy of Music